Clubroot is a common disease of cabbages, broccoli, cauliflower, Brussels sprouts, radishes, turnips, stocks, wallflowers and other plants of the family Brassicaceae (Cruciferae). It is caused by Plasmodiophora brassicae, which was once considered a slime mold but is now put in the group Phytomyxea. It is the first phytomyxean for which the genome has been sequenced. It has as many as thirteen races.  Gall formation or distortion takes place on latent roots and gives the shape of a club or spindle. In the cabbage such attacks on the roots cause undeveloped heads or a failure to head at all, followed often by decline in vigor or by death. It is an important disease, affecting an estimated 10% of the total cultured area worldwide.

Historical reports of clubroot date back to the 13th century in Europe. In the late 19th century, a severe epidemic of clubroot destroyed large proportions of the cabbage crop in St. Petersburg. The Russian scientist Mikhail Woronin eventually identified the cause of clubroot as a "plasmodiophorous organism" in 1875, and gave it the name Plasmodiophora brassicae.

In 18th, 19th and early 20th century Britain clubroot was sometimes called finger and toe, fingers and toes, anbury, or ambury, these last two also meaning a soft tumor on a horse.

The potential of cultural practices to reduce crop losses due to clubroot is limited, and chemical treatments to control the disease are either banned due to environmental regulations or are not cost effective. Breeding of resistant cultivars therefore is a promising alternative.<ref>Hybrid Vegetable Development, by P. K. Singh (Ed.), S. K. Dasgupta (Ed.), S. K. Tripathi (Ed.), Haworth Press. </ref>Clubroot in the cole crops: the interaction between Plasmodiophora brassicae and Brassica oleracea

In cabbagesCabbage clubroot is a disease of Brassicaceae (mustard family or cabbage family) caused by the soil-borne Plasmodiophora brassicae. The disease first appears scattered in fields, but in successive seasons it will infect the entire field, reducing the yield significantly and sometimes resulting in no yield at all. Symptoms appear as yellowing, wilting, stunting, and galls on the roots. It is transmitted by contaminated transplants, animals, surface water runoff, contaminated equipment, and irrigation water. The pathogen can survive in a field for years as resting spores without a host present and will infect the next crop planted if it is a susceptible host. This pathogen prefers a wet climate and a pH around 5.7, so proper irrigation and the addition of compounds that raise the pH can be used to control this disease. Other control methods include sanitation to prevent transmission, chemical control, and resistant varieties.

Hosts and symptoms
Cabbage Clubroot affects cabbage, Chinese cabbage, and Brussels sprouts most severely, but it has a range of hosts that it affects less severely like kohlrabi, kale, cauliflower, collards, broccoli, rutabaga, sea kale, turnips, and radishes.

Developing plants may not show any symptoms but as the plants get older they will start to show symptoms of chlorosis or yellowing, wilting during hot days, and exhibit stunted growth.  Below ground, the roots experience cell proliferation due to increased auxin or growth hormone production from the plant as well as the pathogen. This causes the formation of galls that can grow big enough to restrict the xylem tissue inhibiting efficient water uptake by the plant. Galls appear like clubs or spindles on the roots. Eventually the roots will rot and the plant will die.

Disease cycle
In the spring, resting spores in the soil germinate and produce zoospores.  These zoospores swim through the moist soil and enter host plants through wounds or root hairs. A plasmodium is formed from the division of many amoeba-like cells. This plasmodium eventually divides and forms secondary zoospores that are once again released into the soil.  
The secondary infection by the zoospores can infect the first host or surrounding hosts. These secondary zoospores can be transmitted to other fields through farm machinery or water erosion. They form a secondary plasmodium that affects plant hormones to cause swelling in root cells.  These cells eventually turn into galls or “clubs”. The secondary plasmodium forms the overwintering resting spores which get released into the soil as the “clubs” rot and disintegrate. These resting spores can live in the soil for up to 20 years while they wait for a root tip to come in close proximity for them to infect.

Environment
Clubroot is a disease that prefers warmer temperatures and moist conditions. Ideal conditions for the proliferation of this disease would be a soil temperature between 20–24 °C and a pH less than 6.5; therefore, this disease tends to be prominent in lower fields where water tends to collect.

Management
Clubroot is very hard to control. The primary step for management and long-term control is exclusion of the disease. Good sanitation practice is important with regard to the use of tools and machinery in order to prevent the introduction of the pathogen to a disease-free field. It is not uncommon for an inattentive farmer or gardener to unknowingly carry in the pathogen after being previously exposed to it at a different time. One should avoid purchasing infected transplants of cabbage so as to prohibit the infestation of P. brassicae. Soil type is also an important factor in the development and spread of cabbage clubroot; the use of sand will allow for the plants to grow in well-drained soil, thereby eliminating the possibility of the pathogen to proliferate in a hospitable environment.

Although it is difficult to eradicate the pathogen once it is introduced to a field, there are several methods for its control. Keeping the soil at a slightly basic pH of 7.1–7.2 by the addition of agricultural lime as well as the integration of crop rotation will reduce the occurrence of cabbage clubroot in already infected fields. Fumigation using metam sodium in a field containing diseased cabbages is yet another way to decrease the buildup of the pathogen. Control and management practices on already infected fields help to reduce the overall impact that P. brassicae has on a field of cabbage and other cruciferous plants, but it is extremely difficult to rid an individual plant of the disease once it is already infected.

Importance
Clubroot can be a reoccurring problem for years because it is easily spread from plant to plant. P. brassicae is able to infect 300 species of cruciferous plants, making this disease a recurring problem even with crop rotation. This wide host range allows the pathogen to continue its infection cycle in the absence of cabbages. Additionally, cabbage clubroot may be a stubborn disease due to its ability to form a microbial cyst as an overwintering structure. These cysts may last many years in the soil until it comes into contact with a suitable host, making it difficult to entirely avoid the introduction of the disease. Those growing cabbage need to be aware of the possibility of Plasmodiophora infestation by simply growing in particular fields that may have had cabbage clubroot previously.

Canola infestation in Alberta

In 2003 clubroot was identified in Alberta, Canada, as an outbreak in canola crops in the central area of the province mainly isolated to the Edmonton area. Clubroot is a soilborne disease caused by the biotrophic protist Plasmodiophora brassica. The infection causes the formation of large galls on the roots which look like clubs. These formations impede nutrient and water uptake and can cause plant death, wiping out important money generating canola crops. Initially 12 commercial fields of canola were identified, but that number grew to over 400 by 2008.

In 2007, Alberta declared P.brassicae a pest via the foundation legislation in hopes to help contain spread of the disease.

The Pathotype 3, is the predominant source for Alberta outbreaks. Studies showed that out of the 13 strains of P. brassicae'', the most virulent form is dominant in Alberta.

Studies have shown that infestation numbers are highest at common field entrances and decline as you move further into the field, away from the entrance. From these results, it was concluded that infested soil on farm machinery was increasing spread of the pathogen. Some natural field to field spread is starting to be seen 

Liming has been an effective control measure to curb clubroot since the 19th century. This method does not eradicate clubroot but it will slow its development by creating unfavorable conditions. In addition, calcium and magnesium can be added to the nutrition profile of the soil to help control clubroot. To get efficient results the field soil, [pH] must be kept above 7.5. This takes massive applications to field soil in order to treat all of the soil where spores of clubroot are found. Combining lime with one other treatment has shown most effective.

Several strains of canola have been tried, including European winter canola cv. Mendel (Brassica napus L.), as a clubroot-resistant crop. It has been found that few cultivators exist. Specific genotypes do exist, of the Mendel strain, which could be a solution for canola crops in the Canadian prairies.

Crop rotation with non-host crops is another method to help prevent clubroot. The half life of P. Brassicae is 3.6 years. Unfortunately, long rotations of approximately 20 years are required in order to be effective. This is very difficult with typical canola rotations not being more than three years. Canola crop brings in high revenue to farmers. This would also require complete removal of Cruciferae crops, such as wild radish and mustard.

Some fungicide has been found to help with clubroot but it is very pricey and would take huge amounts to saturate the soil.  The best way to prevent contamination between fields is to clean agricultural equipment and vehicles which have come in contact with club root before moving to a new field. All contaminated soil, equipment and tools must not be moved to clean, disease-free fields. The best preventative method is field monitoring. Throughout the season, plants should be monitored for early symptoms of club root. More research is being conducted for early detection of club root in fall soils.

References

External links 
 Cabbage monstrosities (clubroot of cabbage with rotating QuickTime image). Cornell Mushroom Blog.

Parasitic rhizaria
Parasites of plants
Crucifer diseases